The 2017 European Netball Championship was held in Cardiff was held from 6-8 October 2017. The winners were England over Northern Ireland second. Third was Scotland ahead of hosts Wales fourth. Invited team Fiji were fifth.

Results

Table

† Invited guest

Pool games

Final standings

See also
 European Netball Championship
 Netball Europe

References

2017 in netball
2017
Netball
2017 in English netball
2017 in Welsh women's sport
2017 in Scottish women's sport
2017 in Northern Ireland sport
2017 in Fijian sport
International netball competitions hosted by the United Kingdom
International sports competitions hosted by Wales
Netball